Dehqonobod is a town of Samarqand Region in Uzbekistan. In 2009, the city's status was given.

References

Samarqand Region
Districts of Uzbekistan